Dead Fingers Talk, first published in 1963, was the fifth novel published by Beat Generation author William S. Burroughs. The book was originally published by John Calder in association with Olympia Press.

The book combines sections from Burroughs' earlier novels, Naked Lunch, The Soft Machine and The Ticket That Exploded, in an attempt to create a new narrative. It is sometimes referred to as a compilation, but this is technically incorrect. Its plot cannot be easily described, although it can be said to focus upon conspiracy and the hero getting away from the police. Although the publisher claimed that it contained previously unpublished material, this was not identified until the Restored edition of 2020, edited by Burroughs scholar Oliver Harris, who argued that the text's novelty in any case depended on recognising it as an early experimental remix or mash-up.

Dead Fingers Talk, like many of Burroughs' works, was controversial upon its release. It was the subject of a scathing review in the Times Literary Supplement that resulted in a war of words between supporters and detractors of the novel (and Burroughs in general) that played out in the magazine's letters page for months.

Never published outside the UK or translated, the book itself is considered one of the rarer of Burroughs' novels, and was out of print for almost 50 years before the 2020 Restored edition.

References

External links

1963 American novels
Calder Publishing books
Novels by William S. Burroughs